In basketball, points are the sum of the score accumulated through free throws or field goals. In National Collegiate Athletic Association (NCAA) Division I basketball, where a player's career is at most four seasons under normal circumstances, it is considered a notable achievement to reach the 1,000-points scored threshold. In even rarer instances, players have reached the 2,000- and 3,000-point plateaus (no player, whether male or female, has ever scored 4,000 or more points at the Division I level). The top 25 highest scorers in NCAA Division I women's basketball history are listed below. While the NCAA's current three-division format has been in place since the 1973–74 season, it did not sponsor women's sports until the 1981–82 school year; before that time, women's college sports were governed by the Association of Intercollegiate Athletics for Women (AIAW).

To be listed in the NCAA record book, a player must have been active in at least three seasons during the era in which the NCAA governed women's sports—although for those players who qualify for inclusion in the record book, AIAW statistics are included. Most notably, Lynette Woodard of Kansas, whose career total of 3,649 points makes her the all-time women's college basketball scoring leader, is not recognized as the NCAA career leader because her entire college career (1977–81) predated NCAA sponsorship of women's sports.

Some players among the top 25 scorers in Division I history played in the era before the three-point line was officially adopted in women's basketball on an experimental basis in 1986–87 and fully in 1987–88. All of the players with a dash through the three-point field goals column were affected by this rule. Valorie Whiteside of Appalachian State is the only three-point shot era player on this list who did not make a single three-point shot, and she only played in one season in which the use of the three-pointer was mandatory.

The only player on this list to be enshrined in the Naismith Memorial Basketball Hall of Fame is Cheryl Miller.

Only two players among the top 25 played basketball in more than four seasons. Rachel Banham of Minnesota tore her ACL 10 games into her senior season of 2014–15. She qualified for a medical hardship waiver, popularly known as a "medical redshirt", that allowed her to compete in a fifth season. Ashley Joens of Iowa State benefited from a blanket NCAA waiver that did not count the 2020–21 season, heavily impacted by COVID-19, against the athletic eligibility of any basketball player. Only one player among the top 25 played at more than one school, namely Alysha Clark, who played two seasons at Belmont before transferring to Middle Tennessee.

Key

Top 25 career scoring leaders

Footnotes

References
General
 
 

Specific

Scoring, career
Lists of college women's basketball players in the United States